John Conboy (March 1934 – January 2018) was an American soap opera producer until his death in January 2018.

Life and career
Conboy was born in 1934 in Binghamton, New York. After high school, he graduated from Carnegie Mellon University's College of Fine Arts.

Conboy started his entertainment career as an actor. In 1970, he switched to a producing role, starting with the show Love is a Many Splendored Thing. He won an Emmy Award in 1973 as a producer on The ABC Afternoon Playbreak. Conboy then became a producer on The Young and the Restless, eventually rising to executive producer and earning two more Emmys.

In 1982, Conboy left The Young and the Restless and became executive producer of the newly created CBS soap opera Capitol. He served as the show's executive producer until the series was cancelled in 1987. During the last few years of Capitol, he created Casino which was set in Las Vegas. It was not picked up.

Conboy was hired as executive producer of the NBC Daytime soap opera Santa Barbara in 1990, and won his fourth Emmy Award as producer. However, the show's ratings did not improve, and he was let go in 1991. In December 2002, after nearly a decade of not working in daytime, Conboy was hired as executive producer of Guiding Light, succeeding longtime executive producer Paul Rauch, who stepped down the month prior and interim executive Mary Alice Dwyer-Dobbin. One-year later, Conboy reportedly walked out of his role as executive producer as Guiding Light following several disputes with the serial's producers Procter & Gamble, however, he later returned. In a statement, Conboy stated: "Procter & Gamble, CBS and I agree that my work on Guiding Light is not finished. I look forward to continuing our incredible partnership and all the terrific stories we have yet to tell." In February 2004, it was announced that Conboy would no longer serve as executive producer; Ellen Wheeler was named as his successor.

Conboy died in 2018.

Positions held 
Capitol
 Executive Producer (March 1982– March 1987)

Guiding Light
 Executive Producer (December 2002 – March 2004)

Love Is A Many Splendored Thing
 Producer (1970–1973)

Santa Barbara
 Executive Producer (July 1991 – December 1991)

The Young and the Restless
 Executive Producer (March 1973 – February 1982)

The ABC Afternoon Playbreak: "The Other Woman"

After Hours: From Janice, John, Mary and Michael, with Love

After Hours: Singin', Swingin' and All That Jazz

The Solitary Man (directed by John Llewellyn Moxey & written by Jim Byrnes)

Awards and nominations 
Daytime Emmy Awards

Wins
 (1990; Outstanding Drama Series; Santa Barbara)
 (1975 & 1983; Outstanding Drama Series; The Young and the Restless)
 (1974; Outstanding Drama Special)

Nominations
 (1990; Outstanding Drama Series; Santa Barbara)
 (1975–1976, 1978–1979, 1983; Outstanding Drama Series; The Young and the Restless)

Executive Producing Tenure

References

Soap opera producers
Place of birth missing
1934 births
2018 deaths
American soap opera writers
People from Binghamton, New York